Thanasimodes is a genus of beetles in the subfamily Clerinae.

It was circumscribed by Andrew Murray in 1867.

Species

Extant species include:

 Thanasimodes cyaneopurpureus .  Type locality: Mogadishu. Initially placed in Opilo.
 Thanasimodes desertorum . Type locality: Iferouane. Initially placed in Opilio.
 Thanasimodes dorsalis  Type locality: the north of Africa. Initially placed in Opilo.
 Syn. T. luteofasciatus 
 Thanasimodes gigas . Type locality: Senegal. Initially placed in Notoxus.
 Syn. T. abdominalis ; T. tropicus 
 Thanasimodes insignis . Type locality: Kuraymat, Egypt. Initially placed in Opilo.
 Thanasimodes metallicus . Type locality: Akwa Akpa.
 Thanasimodes robustus  Type locality: Limpopo River. Initially placed in Opilo.

Fossil species include:

 Thanasimodes jantar . Type locality: Baltic amber, Russia, dating from the Priabonian.

Species formerly placed in this genus include:

 Menieroclerus nigropiceus

Notes

References

Further reading

 

 

Cleridae genera
Clerinae